Latvia does not recognize same-sex marriage but same-sex couples are able to register their partnerships with the government through the courts. On 12 November 2020, the Constitutional Court of Latvia ruled that the Latvian Constitution entitles same-sex couples to receive the benefits and protections afforded by Latvian law to married opposite-sex couples, and gave the Saeima until 1 June 2022 to enact a law protecting same-sex couples. In December 2021, the Supreme Court ruled that should the Saeima fail to pass civil union legislation before the 1 June deadline, same-sex couples may apply with a court to have their relationship recognized and enjoy similar rights and benefits to married couples. The Saeima failed to approve such legislation by the deadline, and the first same-sex union was recognized by the Administrative District Court on 30 May.

Civil unions

Background

On 23 September 1999, the Latvian National Human Rights Office introduced a registered partnership bill to the Saeima. On 28 September 1999, the proposal was sent to the Human Rights and Public Affairs Committee of the Saeima for discussion, but it was rejected by the commission on 30 November 1999. In January 2012, the Ombudsman's Office (the renamed National Human Rights Office since 2007) recommended that the Parliament rejected registered partnership legislation. However, after Baltic Pride in June 2012, it was revealed that the Ministry of Justice, led by Gaidis Bērziņš, was considering whether to recognise same-sex partnerships, either as unregistered cohabitation or registered partnerships. Defence Minister Artis Pabriks expressed his support for registered partnerships. Mozaika, Latvia's largest LGBT rights organisation, estimated it would take approximately five years to obtain enough political support to pass the bill.

In November 2014, while commenting on the coming out of the Minister for Foreign Affairs, Edgars Rinkēvičs, and on his call for the recognition of same-sex relationships in Latvia, Prime Minister Laimdota Straujuma reaffirmed her support for the constitutional prohibition on same-sex marriage. She also admitted that "Latvian law has not yet resolved the question of partner-relationships", explaining that the non-recognition of unmarried couples "affects many in Latvia" regardless of sexual orientation and that protection of such families "needs to be discussed by both the community and the Saeima". On 30 January 2015, Veiko Spolītis, an MP from the New Unity party, submitted a bill to modify the Civil Code to legally recognise same-sex partnerships. The proposed law would have allowed "any two persons" to register their partnership and enjoy almost all of the rights and obligations of marriage. The proposal was rejected by the Legal Affairs Committee of the Saeima on 24 February 2015.

On 23 March 2015, the chairperson of For Latvia's Development, Juris Pūce, launched a signature collection campaign on ManaBalss.lv, calling for the passage of a cohabitation law in Latvia. The signatures were submitted to the Saeima in January 2018. In March 2018, the Mandate, Ethics and Submissions Committee recommended 5–4 that the initiative be rejected by the Saeima; 5 out of the 9 committee members voted to recommend rejection, while the 4 others wanted further consideration. In October 2018, the ombudsman called on lawmakers to pass a partnership law for both opposite-sex and same-sex couples, citing statistics showing that about half of Latvian children were born out of wedlock, and arguing that these families should enjoy legal protection. On 20 June 2019, MPs voted against sending the bill to further discussion and review in parliamentary committees; only 23 members voted for the bill, 60 voted against it and one member abstained. The Development/For! and New Unity parties and some Social Democrats supported the bill, while the remaining Social Democrats, Who Owns the State?, the New Conservative Party, the National Alliance and the Union of Greens and Farmers as well as several independents were opposed. Supporters of the bill said they would persevere and persuade lawmakers to discuss it again in the future.

On 29 October 2020, the Saeima voted 55–30 to reject a popular initiative entitled "Registration of same-sex partners", which called for the passage of a civil union law and had been signed by 10,392 citizens. That same day, the authors of the initiative started a new petition, called "For Legal Protection of All Families", which had been signed by 23,392 citizens by March 2022.

Constitutional Court ruling and proposed legislation
On 12 November 2020, the Constitutional Court of Latvia ruled that the labour law violated Article 110 of the Constitution of Latvia, as it did not provide parental leave to the non-biological parent in a same-sex relationship. Although Article 110 has defined marriage as "a union between a man and a woman" since 2006, the term family is not explicitly defined. The court held that the family is not solely a union based on marriage, but a social institution formed by close personal ties based on understanding and respect. The court ruled that the Constitution requires the state to protect same-sex partners, and gave the Saeima until 1 June 2022 to amend the labour law and introduce a measure to legally protect same-sex couples. The Supreme Court ruled in December 2021 that should the government fail to provide a way for same-sex partners to register their relationship by the 1 June deadline, couples would be able to have their relationship recognized by a court. On 2 February 2022, the Ministry of Justice, led by Dzintars Rasnačs, presented a civil union bill that would provide same-sex couples with some of the rights and benefits of marriage. The second largest parliamentary group in the Saeima, the New Conservative Party, announced its support for the bill, despite the party having opposed all previous attempts to establish civil unions. The leader of the Social Democratic Party, Jānis Urbanovičs, also indicated that the bill might receive broader support from the members of his parliamentary group.

On 31 March 2022, the Saeima sent the civil union bill to the Legal Affairs Committee and approved it in first reading, with those opposed boycotting the vote in hopes of the Saeima failing to meet the necessary quorum, but ultimately failing with exactly half of all MPs participating in the vote.

The bill's final reading was blocked on 2 June due to a lack of quorum, as only 40 MPs participated in the vote, and Speaker Ināra Mūrniece ended the parliamentary session without the bill being passed. The legislation was placed on the agenda for a future sitting of Parliament, and needed to pass before the parliamentary election scheduled for 1 October 2022. As a result, the 1 June deadline by the Constitutional Court expired, meaning that same-sex couples may now apply with a court to request recognition of their relationship and enjoy some of the benefits and obligations offered by marriage. The Vice-President of the Constitutional Court, Irēna Kucina, said that "institutions and administrative courts will apply the Constitution directly". On 30 May, the Administrative District Court in Riga granted the first application of a same-sex couple and recognised the "public legal existence" of their relationship, concluding that the couple has a relationship that fits the definition outlined in Article 110 of the Constitution. The court lamented that the Saeima had not "fulfilled its duty". By 8 July 2022, the Administrative District Court had granted civil union status to four same-sex couples. 16 same-sex couples had been recognized by 28 October 2022.

The proposed legislation in the Saeima would have established civil unions providing some of the rights, obligations and benefits of marriage, including in the areas of property, inheritance and tax. The bill would have also allowed same-sex partners to obtain information on the health of a hospitalised partner and make emergency health decisions, receive benefits in the event their partner dies, and claim care for their partner in the event that they have a disability. Civil unions would have been open to all adult citizens and non-residents of Latvia, including refugees and stateless people, but would not have been allowed to persons who are already married, in another civil union or who are blood relatives or related by adoption. They would have been registered and dissolved using a procedure similar to that for civil marriage. However, the bill would have not allowed same-sex couples to share a common surname or to adopt. In addition, parties to a civil union would not have automatically become heirs to the common property, but the partners would have been able to draw up a will or a contract of inheritance to legally contract for how their protected common property would have been divided before any eventual separation.

On 6 December 2022, following the October elections, the Legal Affairs Committee rejected the proposed civil union bill. However, registering a civil union through the Administrative District Court is still possible.

Same-sex marriage

Constitution
In December 2005, the Saeima voted 65–5 to approve an amendment to the Constitution of Latvia banning same-sex marriage. The amendment took effect on 17 January 2006. Article 110 reads: "The State shall protect and support marriage — a union between a man and a woman, the family, the rights of parents and rights of the child".

Legal challenges

2018 European Court of Justice ruling

	
On 5 June 2018, the European Court of Justice ruled that member states of the European Union must recognise the freedom of movement and residency rights of same-sex spouses, provided one partner is an EU citizen. The court ruled that EU member states may choose whether or not to allow same-sex marriage, but they cannot obstruct the freedom of residence of an EU citizen and their spouse. In addition, the court ruled that the term "spouse" is gender-neutral, and that it does not necessarily imply a person of the opposite sex. The Latvian Government and the Office of Citizenship and Migration Affairs announced their intention to abide by this directive. At least one same-sex partner, who had married in Portugal, had received a residency permit by June 2018.

2021 Supreme Court ruling
On 27 May 2016, the Supreme Court of Latvia overturned an administrative court decision that refused to register a same-sex marriage. A Supreme Court press spokeswoman said that the court agreed with the administrative court that current regulations do not allow for same-sex marriages to be legally recognized in Latvia; however, the matter "should have been considered in a context not of marriage, but of registering familial partnership". Additionally, it would have been impossible to conclude whether the applicants' rights had been violated unless their claim was accepted and reviewed in a proper manner. The Supreme Court ruled in December 2021 that Latvia lacks a civil partnership law and that court rulings could serve as a substitute for the registration of same-sex relationships until lawmakers pass a partnership law. The court held that, "The obligation to ensure the legal protection of same-sex couples also follows from the principle of human dignity, which requires recognizing the inherent dignity and equal value of each human being."

Public opinion
The 2015 Eurobarometer found that 19% of Latvians supported same-sex marriage. In 2019, the Eurobarometer showed that support had increased to 24%, while 70% were opposed.

See also 
 LGBT rights in Latvia
 Recognition of same-sex unions in Europe
 Same-sex union court cases

Notes

References 

LGBT rights in Latvia
Latvia